The Translation Office (also spelled Terceme Odası, or Terdjuman Odasi; , also rendered as Bureau des Interprètes or Cabinet des Traducteurs) was an organ of the Government of the Ottoman Empire that translated documents from one language to another.

The government created it in 1821 as the Ottoman authorities wanted to train their own corps of Turkish translators instead of using Phanariotes due to the Greek War of Independence occurring. Most of the staff at Ottoman diplomatic missions in Europe originated from this office.

Salaries and prominence of the office increased after the 1830s in the aftermath of the Battle of Konya and Treaty of Hünkâr İskelesi.

The office created French-language versions of official documents, which catered to foreigners and Ottoman non-Muslims.

Notable staff
 Mehmed Emin Âli Pasha
 Mehmed Fuad Pasha

See also
 Dragoman
 Languages of the Ottoman Empire
 Foreign relations of the Ottoman Empire

References

External links
  - Master's degree thesis

Government of the Ottoman Empire
1821 establishments in the Ottoman Empire